The Hymn Society may refer to:
The Hymn Society of Great Britain and Ireland
The Hymn Society in the United States and Canada